Mesodina halyzia, the eastern iris-skipper or halyzia skipper, is a butterfly of the family Hesperiidae. It is endemic to the Australian states of New South Wales, Queensland and Victoria.

The wingspan is about 30 mm.

The larvae feed on Patersonia fragilis, Patersonia glabrata, Patersonia occidentalis and Patersonia sericea. They construct a shelter made by joining the leaves of its host plant with silk, where it rests during the day.

External links
Australian Insects
Australian Faunal Directory

Trapezitinae
Butterflies described in 1868
Butterflies of Australia
Taxa named by William Chapman Hewitson